Syrmoptera melanomitra is a butterfly in the family Lycaenidae. It is found in Cameroon, Gabon, the Republic of the Congo and the Democratic Republic of the Congo.

Subspecies
Syrmoptera melanomitra melanomitra (Cameroon, Gabon, Congo, Democratic Republic of the Congo: Cataractes, Kinshasa and Mongala)
Syrmoptera melanomitra nivea Joicey & Talbot, 1924 (Democratic Republic of the Congo: Mongala, Uele, Tshopo, Tshuapa, Equateur and Sankuru)

References

External links
Die Gross-Schmetterlinge der Erde 13: Die Afrikanischen Tagfalter. Plate XIII 66 h

Butterflies described in 1895
Theclinae
Butterflies of Africa